Palumbina is a genus of moths in the family Gelechiidae.

Species
The species of this genus are:

Palumbina albilustra Walia & Wadahawan, 2004 (from India)
Palumbina chelophora (Meyrick, 1918)  (from India)
Palumbina diplobathra (Meyrick, 1918)  (from India)
Palumbina fissilis (Meyrick, 1918)  (from India)
Palumbina glaucitis Meyrick, 1907  (from India and Sri Lanka))
Palumbina guerinii (Stainton, 1858) (Mediterranean & Kenya)
Palumbina longipalpis Bradley, 1961 (from Guadalcanal)
Palumbina macrodelta (Meyrick, 1918) (from India)
Palumbina nephelochtha (Meyrick, 1927)  (from Samoa)
Palumbina nesoclera Meyrick, 1929
Palumbina oxyprora (Meyrick, 1922) (from China)
Palumbina pylartis (Meyrick, 1908) (from India)
Palumbina shivai Walia & Wadahawan, 2004  (from India)
Palumbina tanyrrhina (Meyrick, 1921) (from Java)
Palumbina triphona (Meyrick, 1927) (from Samoa)

References

 
Thiotrichinae